Rónald Chaves Hidalgo (born 6 December 1970 in Esparza, Puntarenas) is a retired Costa Rican footballer.

Club career
Nicknamed el Carraco, Chaves played for Municipal Puntarenas, Ramonense, Alajuelense and Cartaginés. He won the 1996-97 Primera División de Costa Rica with Alajuelense.

International career
He was a non-playing squad member at the 1989 FIFA World Youth Championship in Saudi Arabia.

Chaves made his debut for the senior Costa Rica national football team in a February 1997 friendly match against Slovakia and earned a total of 4 caps, scoring no goals. He has represented his country in 1 FIFA World Cup qualification match

Managerial career
He was manager of Ramonense in 2009 but was dismisses after the 2010 Apertura.
In 2013, Chaves was appointed manager of Puntarenas.

References

External links
 

1970 births
Living people
People from Puntarenas Province
Association football midfielders
Costa Rican footballers
Costa Rica international footballers
Costa Rica under-20 international footballers
Puntarenas F.C. players
A.D. Ramonense players
L.D. Alajuelense footballers
C.S. Cartaginés players
Liga FPD players
Costa Rican football managers
Puntarenas F.C. managers